Henri Maigrot (1857 Toulouse - 1933  Nesles-la-Vallée)  was a French writer, artist and caricaturist. He was known under the pen name of Henriot or Pit. He was the father of the poet Émile Henriot.

Life

Works

Napoléon aux enfers  (Napoleon in hell)
Les Régiments de France, histoire des Zouaves, Paris, c 1900
L'Année parisienne éditions Conquet 1894
Aventures prodigieuses de Cyrano de Bergerac, Pellerin, Épinal, 1900
 Histoire d'un vieux chêne. 
 Paris en l’an 3000 Henri Laurens, Paris, 1910.

External links
  
 
 

1857 births
1933 deaths
Artists from Toulouse
French caricaturists
French illustrators